Justice is a census-designated place in Mingo County, West Virginia, United States. Justice has a post office with ZIP code 24851. As of the 2010 census, its population was 412.

The community was named after W. E. Justice, an early postmaster.

References

Census-designated places in Mingo County, West Virginia
Census-designated places in West Virginia
Populated places on the Guyandotte River